SKIF Semberija is a Swedish football club located in Göteborg.

Background
SKIF Semberija currently plays in Division 4 Göteborg A which is the sixth tier of Swedish football. They play their home matches at the Bergsjövallen in Göteborg.

The club is affiliated to Göteborgs Fotbollförbund.

Season to season

Footnotes

External links
 SKIF Semberija – Official website
 SKIF Semberija on Facebook

Football clubs in Gothenburg
Semberija
Football clubs in Västra Götaland County